The Green Cinema was a film theatre that operated for over half a century in Dublin, Ireland until its closure in 1987.

Originally known as the Stephen's Green Cinema, it was located on the west side of St Stephen's Green. It opened on Wednesday, 18 December 1935 in an official ceremony performed by the Lord Mayor of Dublin, Alfie Byrne. The Green was designed by architects Jones and Kelly and had a seating capacity of 1,500. Some seats were equipped with a Fortephone apparatus which enabled deaf patrons to hear the soundtrack. The first film to be screened at the Green was Paris Love Song, starring Mary Ellis and Tullio Carminati.

In October 1987, the Green Cinema was purchased by the Dublin hotelier, PV Doyle, for £1.5m. The cinema was demolished shortly afterwards and the site remained derelict until 2002, when work began on the construction of a new office block. In 2005, the new building was leased by Bank of Scotland (Ireland) as their Irish headquarters.

Sources

1987 disestablishments
Former cinemas in Dublin (city)
Theatres completed in 1935